Sundar Shyam (5 July 1930 – 26 March 2020) was an Indian wrestler. He competed in the men's freestyle featherweight at the 1960 Summer Olympics.

References

External links
 

1930 births
2020 deaths
Indian male sport wrestlers
Olympic wrestlers of India
Wrestlers at the 1960 Summer Olympics
Sportspeople from Amritsar